Kilcroagh may refer to:

Kilcroagh, County Antrim, a townland in County Antrim, Northern Ireland
Kilcroagh, County Tyrone, a townland in County Tyrone, Northern Ireland